The University of Southampton (abbreviated as Soton in post-nominal letters) is a public research university in Southampton, England. Southampton is a founding member of the Russell Group of research-intensive universities in the United Kingdom, and ranked in the top 100 universities in the world.

The university has seven campuses. The main campus is located in the Highfield area of Southampton and is supplemented by four other campuses within the city: Avenue Campus housing the School of Humanities, the National Oceanography Centre housing courses in Ocean and Earth Sciences, Southampton General Hospital offering courses in Medicine and Health Sciences, and Boldrewood Campus housing an engineering and maritime technology campus and Lloyd's Register. In addition, the university operates a School of Art based in nearby Winchester and an international branch in Malaysia offering courses in Engineering. Each campus is equipped with its own library facilities. The annual income of the institution for 2021–22 was £666.8 million of which £114 million was from research grants and contracts, with an expenditure of £733.7 million.

The University of Southampton currently has  undergraduate and  postgraduate students, making it the largest university by higher education students in the South East region. The University of Southampton Students' Union, provides support, representation and social activities for the students ranging from involvement in the Union's four media outlets, to any of the 200 affiliated societies and 80 sports. The university owns and operates a sports ground for use by students and also operates a sports centre on the main campus.

History

Hartley Institution

The University of Southampton has its origin as the Hartley Institution which was formed in 1862 from a benefaction by Henry Robinson Hartley (1777–1850).  Hartley had inherited a fortune from two generations of successful wine merchants. At his death in 1850, he left a bequest of £103,000 to the Southampton Corporation for the study and advancement of the sciences in his property on Southampton's High Street, in the city centre.

Hartley was an eccentric straggler, who had little liking of the new age docks and railways in Southampton. He did not desire to create a college for many (as formed at similar time in other English industrial towns and commercial ports) but a cultural centre for Southampton's intellectual elite. After lengthy legal challenges to the Bequest, and a public debate as to how best interpret the language of his Will, the Southampton Corporation choose to create the Institute (rather than a more widely accessible college, that some public figures had lobbied for).

On 15 October 1862, the Hartley Institute was opened by the Prime Minister Lord Palmerston in a major civic occasion which exceeded in splendor anything that anyone in the town could remember. After initial years of financial struggle, the Hartley Institute became the Hartley College in 1883. This move was followed by increasing numbers of students, teaching staff, an expansion of the facilities and registered lodgings for students.

University College

In 1902, the Hartley College became the Hartley University college, a degree awarding branch of the University of London. This was after inspection of the teaching and finances by the University College Grants Committee, and donations from Council members (including William Darwin the then Treasurer). An increase in student numbers in the following years motivated fund raising efforts to move the college to greenfield land around Back Lane (now University Road) in the Highfield area of Southampton. On 20 June 1914, Viscount Haldane opened the new site of the renamed Southampton University College. However, the outbreak of the First World War six weeks later meant no lectures could take place there, as the buildings were handed over by the college authorities for use as a military hospital. To cope with the volume of casualties, wooden huts were erected at the rear of the building. These were donated to university by the War Office after the end of fighting, in time for the transfer from the high street premises in 1920. At this time, Highfield Hall, a former country house and overlooking Southampton Common, for which a lease had earlier been secured, commenced use as a halls of residence for female students. South Hill, on what is now the Glen Eyre Halls Complex was also acquired, along with South Stoneham House to house male students.

Further expansion through the 1920s and 1930s was made possible through private donors, such as the two daughters of Edward Turner Sims for the construction of the university library, and from the people of Southampton, enabling new buildings on both sides of University Road. During World War II the university suffered damage in the Southampton Blitz with bombs landing on the campus and its halls of residence. The college decided against evacuation, instead expanding its Engineering Department, School of Navigation and developing a new School of Radio Telegraphy. The university hosted the Supermarine plans and design team for a period but in December 1940 further bomb hits resulted in it being relocated to Hursley House.

Halls of residence were used to house Polish, French and American troops. After the war, departments such as Electronics grew under the influence of Erich Zepler and the Institute of Sound and Vibration was established.

University

On 29 April 1952, Queen Elizabeth II granted the University of Southampton a Royal Charter, the first to be given to a university during her reign, which enabled it to award degrees. Six faculties were created: Arts, Science, Engineering, Economics, Education and Law. The first University of Southampton degrees were awarded on 4 July 1953, following the appointment of the Duke of Wellington as Chancellor of the university. Student and staff numbers grew throughout the next couple of decades as a response to the Robbins Report. The campus also grew significantly, when in July 1961 the university was given the approval to acquire some 200 houses on or near the campus by the Borough Council. In addition, more faculties and departments were founded, including Medicine and Oceanography (despite the discouragement of Sir John Wolfenden, the chairman of the University Grants Committee). Student accommodation was expanded throughout the 1960s and 1970s with the acquisition of Chilworth manor and new buildings at the Glen Eyre and Montefiore complexes.

In 1987, a crisis developed when the University Grants Committee announced, as part of nationwide cutbacks, a series of reductions in the funding of the university. To eliminate the expected losses, the budgets and deficits subcommittee proposed reducing staff numbers. This proposal was met with demonstrations on campus and was later reworked (to reduce the redundancies and reallocate the reductions in faculties funding) after being rejected by the university Senate.

By the mid-1980s through to the 1990s, the university looked to expand with new buildings on the Highfield campus, developing the Chilworth Manor site into a science park and conference venue, opening the National Oceanography Centre at a dockside location and purchasing new land from the City Council for the Arts Faculty and sports fields (at Avenue Campus and Wide Lane, respectively).

Research university

Under the leadership of then Vice-Chancellor, Sir Howard Newby the university became more focused in encouraging and investment in more and better quality research. In the mid-1990s, the university gained two new campuses, as the Winchester School of Art and La Sainte Union College became part of the university. A new school for Nursing and Midwifery was also created and went on to provide training for NHS professionals in central-southern England. This involved a huge increase in student numbers and the establishment of sub-campuses in Basingstoke, Winchester, Portsmouth and Newport, Isle of Wight.

In the autumn of 1997, the university experienced Britain's worst outbreak of meningitis, with the death of three students. The university responded to the crisis by organising a mass vaccination programme, and later took the ground-breaking decision to offer all new students vaccinations.

The university celebrated its Golden Jubilee on 22 January 2002. By this time, Southampton had research income that represented over half of the total income. In recent years a number of new landmark buildings have been added as part of the estates development. New constructions on the main campus include the Jubilee Sports Complex in 2004, the EEE (ECS, Education and Entrance) building in 2007, the new Mountbatten building in 2008 housing the School of Electronics and Computer Science following a fire and the Life Sciences building in 2010. In addition, the Hartley Library and Student Services Centre were both extended and redesigned in 2005 and the Students' Union was also extended in 2002. Other constructions include the Archaeology building on Avenue Campus in 2006 and the Institute of Development Sciences building at Southampton General Hospital in 2007. The university has also significantly redeveloped its Boldrewood Campus which is home to part of the engineering faculty and to Lloyd's Register's Global Technology Centre.

The university joined the Science and Engineering South Consortium (SES) on 9 May 2013. The SES was created to pool the collective insights and resources of the University of Oxford, University of Cambridge, Imperial College London and University College London to innovate and explore new ideas through collaboration whilst providing efficiencies of scale and shared utilisation of facilities. This is the most powerful cluster of research intensive universities in the UK and the new consortium is to become one of the world's leading hubs for science and engineering research.

In 2015, the university started a fundraising campaign to build the Centre for Cancer Immunology based at Southampton General Hospital. At the beginning of 2018, the target amount of £25 million was raised, allowing 150 scientists to move into the building in March 2018. The Centre for Cancer Immunology is the first of its kind in the UK and contains facilities that will hosts clinical trial units and laboratories that will explore the relationship between cancer and the immune system.

Campuses
The university has seven educational campuses – five in Southampton, one in Winchester, and one international branch in Malaysia. The university operates a science park in Chilworth. The university also owns sports facilities and halls of residences on a variety of other nearby sites.

Highfield Campus

The university's main campus is located in the residential area of Highfield. Opened on 20 June 1914, the site was initially used as a military hospital during World War I. The campus grew gradually, mainly consisting of detailed red brick buildings (such as the Hartley library and West building of the Students' Union) designed by Sir Giles Gilbert Scott. In 1956, Sir Basil Spence was commissioned to prepare a masterplan of the campus for the foreseeable future. This included incorporating the University Road, that split the  campus in two and the quarry of Sir Sidney Kimber's brickyard that itself was split by a stream. Unable to remove the road and the private houses along it, Spence designed many of the buildings facing away from it, using contemporary designs working in concrete, glass and mosaic. During recent decades, new buildings were added that contravened the master plan of Spence, such as the Synthetic Chemistry Building and Mountbatten Building (the latter of which was destroyed by fire in 2005).

In 1991, the Highfield Planning Group was formed within the university under the chairmanship of Tim Holt. This led to the development of new buildings such as the Jubilee Sports Hall, Student Services Building and the Institute of Sound and Vibration Research. In addition, existing buildings, such as the Hartley Library, were extensively renovated and extended. A new masterplan for the Highfield campus was drawn up in 1998 by Rick Mather, who proposed that the University Road should become a tree-lined boulevard backed by white-rendered buildings. He also contributed some of the newer buildings such as the Zepler and Gower Buildings.

Avenue Campus

Avenue Campus is currently home to the Faculty of Humanities, with the exception of Music, and is located a short distance away from the main Highfield campus. The site previously housed the Southampton Tramsheds and Richard Taunton's College, of which the existing building still stands on the site. It was purchased by the university from Southampton City Council for £2 million in December 1993 so that the university could expand – planning regulations meant that excess land on the Highfield campus couldn't be built on and had to be reserved for future car parking spaces. The car parking spaces have now been built. The departments moved onto the campus in 1996. The campus consists of the original Tauntons building from the early 20th century but redeveloped with a glass-fronted courtyard and extension and a new Archaeology building built in 2006 costing £2.7 million.

Boldrewood Campus

Boldrewood Campus, located a short distance from the Highfield campus, houses the university's new Maritime Centre of Excellence, the Southampton Marine and Maritime Institute and Lloyd's Register's Group Technology Centre.

The campus was formerly the Biomedical Sciences campus of the university and acted, until 2010, as a non-hospital base for the School of Medicine and home to a research facility for the Biological Sciences. These departments were then relocated to either Southampton General Hospital, the new Life Sciences building at Highfield, or the University of Southampton science park.

National Oceanography Centre, Southampton

The National Oceanography Centre, Southampton (NOCS) is located in Southampton Docks three miles south of the main university campus. The campus is home of the university's Ocean and Earth Sciences department and is also a campus of the Natural Environment Research Council's research institute, the National Oceanography Centre. Five of the National Oceanography Centre's research divisions are based on the campus.

Planning of the campus began in 1989 and was completed in 1994 due to cuts and uncertainties whether a national research centre could be successfully integrated with a university. It was opened in 1996 by Prince Philip, Duke of Edinburgh. The campus was also the base for the NERC purpose-built research vessels RRS James Cook and until recently the RRS Discovery and the RRS Charles Darwin.

University Hospital Southampton (UHS)

The university maintains a presence at Southampton General in partnership with the NHS trust operating the hospital. It is home to some operations of the Faculty of Medicine and the Faculty of Health Sciences, although these two faculties have bases on Highfield campus. As a teaching hospital, it is used by a range of undergraduate and postgraduate medical students, research academics and clinicians.

The university's involvement began in 1971, when it became the first to house a new school of medicine alongside the universities of Nottingham and Leicester, and currently extends to several operations and specific research centres.

Winchester School of Art

The Winchester School of Art, located in central Winchester, houses the university's arts and textiles courses that are part of the Faculty of Arts and Humanities. The school itself was established in the 1960s and was integrated into the University of Southampton in 1996. The campus contains the original school buildings from the 1960s, in addition to structures built when the merger occurred and in 1998 when the Textile Conservation Centre moved to the site from Hampton Court Palace. The centre remained with the school until its closure in 2009.

Malaysia Campus (University of Southampton Malaysia - UoSM)
The university opened its first international campus in Iskandar Puteri, Malaysia in October 2012. Located in the state of Johor near the southwestern tip of Malaysia, the campus is located within EduCity in Iskandar Puteri - a new city comprising universities and institutes of higher education, academia-industry action and R&D centres, as well as student accommodation, shared sports and recreational facilities.

The campus operates courses in engineering, it offers an Engineering foundation year programme and MEng programmes in Aeronautics and Astronautics, Mechanical Engineering and Electrical and Electronic Engineering. All programmes have been approved by the Malaysian Qualifications Agency (MQA) and the Board of Engineers Malaysia (BEM).

The split campus degree programmes take place in Malaysia for the first two years, with the final two years at Southampton. In 2016, the Malaysia Campus' first group of students graduated, along with the first PhD graduate.

As part of its expansion plans, the University of Southampton Malaysia has moved into its new 150,000sq ft state-of-the-art estate in Eco Botanic City, Iskandar Puteri. The new campus is equipped with a myriad of open learning spaces, lecture halls, an Aerospace Lab, a Design Studio, Business Experimental Labs, and a 12-terminal Bloomberg Suite to enhance the quality and learning experience throughout the students’ journey. From the initial offerings of four Engineering programmes, UoSM has now grown to offer 20 programmes in the fields of Engineering, Business and Computer Science fields.

Currently, among all the British universities with a campus in Malaysia, UoSM is the only one that is ranked in the world’s top 100 universities and the Top UK University in Malaysia.

Science Park

The University of Southampton Science Park contains approximately 50 businesses connected to the university. Originally established in 1983 as Chilworth Science Park, named after the manor house that is now a luxury hotel and conference centre, the park houses business incubator units to help these companies. The companies occupying the park range in expertise and fields including oil and gas exploration, pharmaceuticals, nanotechnology and optoelectronics, with three of the twelve successful spin-out companies created since 2000 being floated on London's Alternative Investment Market (AIM) with a combined market capitalisation value of £160 million.
The park was renamed in 2006.

Transport links

To connect the university's Southampton campuses, halls of residence, hospitals, and other important features of the city, the university operates the Unilink bus service for the benefit of the students, staff and the general public. The service is currently operated by local bus company Bluestar using the Unilink name. The service consists of four routes. The U1 runs between Southampton Airport and the National Oceanography Centre via Wessex Lane Halls, Highfield campus, Portswood, Southampton City Centre and Southampton Central railway station. The other regular routes, the U2 and the U6, run between the City Centre and Bassett Green and Southampton General Hospital respectively while the final route, the U9, runs an infrequent service between Southampton General hospital and Townhill Park. Students who live in halls of residence provided by the university receive an annual bus pass, allowing them to use all Unilink services for free.

Organisation

Governance 

Responsibility for running the university is held formally by the Chancellor and led at the executive level by the Vice-Chancellor, currently Prof Mark E. Smith. The key bodies in the university governance structure are the Council and Senate.

The Council is the governing body of the university. It is ultimately responsible for the overall planning and management of the university. The council is also responsible for ensuring that the funding made available to the university by the Higher Education Funding Council for England is used as prescribed. The council is composed of members from 5 different classes, namely (1) officers; (2) eight lay members appointed by the council; (3) four members appointed by the Senate; (4) one member of the non-teaching staff; (5) the President of the Students' Union.

The Senate is the university's primary academic authority, with responsibilities which include the direction and regulation of education and examinations, the award of degrees, and the promotion of research. The Senate has approximately 65 members, including the Vice-Presidents, the Deans and representatives from the academic staff in each faculty and those administrative groups most closely associated with educational activities, and representatives of the Students' Union. The Senate is chaired by the Vice-Chancellor.

Faculties
The university comprises five faculties, each with a number of academic units. This current faculty structure came into effect in 2018, taking over from a previous structure consisting of eight faculties.  The current faculty structure is:

Faculty of Arts and Humanities
Humanities
Winchester School of Art
Faculty of Engineering and Physical Sciences
Chemistry
Electronics and Computer Science
Engineering
Physics and Astronomy
Faculty of Environmental and Life Sciences
Biological Sciences
Geography and Environmental Science
Health Sciences (nursing, midwifery, allied health professionals)
Ocean and Earth Sciences
National Oceanography Centre
Psychology
Faculty of Medicine
Southampton Medical School
Faculty of Social Sciences
Economic, Social and Political Sciences
Southampton Statistical Sciences Research Institute
Mathematical Sciences
Southampton Business School
Southampton Education School
Southampton Law School

Affiliations
Southampton is a founding member of the Russell Group of research-intensive universities in Britain.

Academic profile

Courses and subjects
Southampton awards a wide range of academic degrees spanning academic degrees for bachelor's in a variety of degrees and master's degrees as well as junior doctorates and higher doctorates. The postnominals awarded are the degree abbreviations used commonly among British universities. The university is part of the Engineering Doctorate scheme, for the award of Eng. D. degrees.

Short courses and professional development courses are run by many of the university's Academic Schools and Research Centres.

The university works closely with members of the Armed Forces. It provides professional military educators in the British Army to study for a Postgraduate Certificate in Education (PGCE). The university also works with the Royal Navy to provide training and qualifications towards Chartered Engineer status.

Admissions 

In terms of average UCAS points of entrants, Southampton ranked 25th in Britain in 2023. The university gives offers of admission to 84.0% of its applicants, the 6th highest amongst the Russell Group.

According to the 2017 Times and Sunday Times Good University Guide, approximately 15% of Southampton's undergraduates come from independent schools. In the 2016–17 academic year, the university had a domicile breakdown of 72:7:21 of UK:EU:non-EU students respectively with a female to male ratio of 53:47.

Rankings and reputation

In the 2023 international university rankings, Southampton ranked 78th (QS World University Rankings) and 108th (Times Higher Education World University Rankings). The 2022 Round University Ranking ranked Southampton 72nd globally, and the 2022 CWTS Leiden Ranking placed Southampton 85th worldwide. The 2021 U.S. News & World Report ranks Southampton 97th in the world and 11th in the UK.

Southampton was originally awarded Bronze ("provision is of satisfactory quality") in the 2017 Teaching Excellence Framework, a government assessment of the quality of undergraduate teaching in universities and other higher education providers in England. The Bronze award was appealed by the university, however it was rejected by the HEFCE in August 2017. In response, the university's Vice Chancellor, Christopher Snowden, claimed the exercise was "devoid of any meaningful assessment of teaching" and that "there are serious lessons to be learned if the TEF is to gain public confidence." Enrollment into the exercise was voluntary and institutions were made aware of the metrics used before agreeing to be assessed by the TEF. In January 2018, the university confirmed that it would re-enter the TEF believing that it would benefit from changed evaluations that would benefit Russell Group universities. In 2018, Southampton was awarded Silver by the Teaching Excellence Framework Panel.

The Guardian ranked the university at number 1 in the UK for Civil Engineering and Electronic and Electrical Engineering in 2020.

In the 2021 Research Excellence Framework (REF), which assesses the quality of research in UK higher education institutions, Southampton is ranked 17th by GPA and 16th for research power (the grade point average score of a university, multiplied by the full-time equivalent number of researchers submitted).

Research
The university conducts research in most academic disciplines and is home to a number of notable research centres. Southampton has leading research centres in a number of disciplines, e.g. music, computer sciences, engineering or management sciences, and houses world-leading research institutions in fields as varied as oceanography and web science.

Within the university there are a number of research institutes and groups that aim to pool resources on a specific research area. Institutes or groups identified by the university of being of significant importance are marked in italics.

Institute of Sound and Vibration Research

The Institute of Sound and Vibration Research (ISVR), is an acoustical research institute which is part of the University of Southampton. Founded in 1963, it has been awarded a 2006 Queen's Anniversary Prize for Higher and Further Education.

ISVR is divided into four distinct groups of research:
The Dynamics Group, (specialised in the modelling, measurement and control of structural vibrations).
The Fluid Dynamics and Acoustics Group (including the Rolls-Royce University Technology Centre in Gas Turbine Noise) specialised in three fields which are aero-acoustics of aircraft engines, ultrasonics and underwater acoustics, noise source imaging and virtual acoustics.
The Human Sciences Group (including the Hearing and Balance Centre and the Human Factors Research Unit) specialises in the human response to sound and vibration.
The Signal Processing and Control Group, which specialises in acoustics, dynamics, audiology and human sciences and as a basis for control of sound and vibration.

ISVR offers a number of Undergraduate and Postgraduate degree programmes in acoustical engineering, acoustics & music and audiology.

EPrints

The School of Electronics and Computer Science created the first archiving software (EPrints) to publish its research freely available on the Web. This software is used throughout the university and as an archiving system for many different institutions around the world.

Libraries

The university has libraries located on each of the academic campuses and in total the collection holds over 1.5 million books and periodicals.

The university's primary library is the Hartley Library, located on Highfield campus and first built in 1935 and extended further in 1959 and 2005. The majority of the books and periodicals are held there as well as specialist collections of works such as Ford collection of Parliamentary papers and the European Documentation Centre. In addition, the main library houses the Special Collections and Archives centre, housing more than 6 million manuscripts and a large archive of rare books. Specific collections include the correspondence of Arthur Wellesley, 1st Duke of Wellington, acquired by the university in 1983, as well as the Broadlands Archive, including the Palmerston and Mountbatten papers. The library also contains 4,500 volumes of Claude Montefiore's library on Theology and Judaism, the Ford Parliamentary Papers, Frank Perkins' collection of books on agriculture, Sir Samuel Gurney-Dixon's Dante collection and the James Parkes Library of Jewish/non-Jewish relations. The library also includes six rare editions of the Divina Commedia; the first of these, the Brescia edition of 1487, is the library's earliest book.

In addition to the main Hartley Library, there are other libraries based at the university's other campuses primarily focused on the subjects studied at that location. As one of the smaller libraries and given its proximity to the Highfield campus, the Avenue Library only houses a collection of key Humanities resources. It does however also hold an extensive film library, many of an international nature. On a larger scale, the libraries at the National Oceanography Centre, Southampton General Hospital, Winchester School of Art are more complete and house the majority of the resources and specialist collections on oceanography and earth sciences, healthcare and art and design respectively. The Malaysia campus holds a small collection of reference books but the majority of the resources needed for courses at the campus are available online. Separate from the Hartley Library is the E. J. Richards Engineering Library, which contains further materials for more in-depth study and is freely accessible to Engineering students and staff.

Arts

The university's main Highfield campus is home to three main arts venues supported and funded by the university and Arts Council England. The Nuffield Theatre opened in 1963 with construction funded by a grant from the Nuffield Foundation of £130,000 (£2,450,000 in 2013). The building was designed by Sir Basil Spence as part of his campus masterplan with additional direction provided by Sir Richard Southern. The theatre consists of a 480-seat auditorium, that also served as the principal lecture theatre at the time of construction, as well as additional lecture theatres and adjacent Kitchen bar. The theatre went into administration in May 2020 and permanent closure was announced in July 2020.

The Turner Sims Concert Hall was added to the art provision in October 1974 following a £30,000 (£460,000 in 2012) donation from Margaret Grassam Sims in 1967. It was made to provide a venue specifically for music following difficulties in gaining space in the Nuffield Theatre and due to acoustical differences with the spaces. The new space has a single auditorium, designed by the university's Institute of Sound and Vibration Research with musical performances in mind, with a flat space at the bottom so it could be used for exams.

The final of the three Art Council supported venues on campus is the John Hansard Gallery. The gallery was opened on 22 September 1980 but is housed in a building that previously housed a tidal model of Southampton Water between 1957 and 1978. It took over responsibility from a photographic gallery, a gallery in the Nuffield Theatre and one located on Boldrewood campus. It houses various exhibitions in contemporary art and is due to move to new premises in Guildhall Square in c.2015.

In addition, the western half of Highfield campus contain several 20th-century sculptures by Barbara Hepworth, Justin Knowles, Nick Pope and John Edwards.

Student life

Students' Union

The University of Southampton Students' Union (SUSU) is the university students' union and has a range of facilities located on the Highfield campus and on the Winchester School of Art campus. At Highfield the union is sited in three buildings opposite the Hartley Library. The main building (Building 42) was built in the 1960s as part of the Basil Spence masterplan. The building was also extensively renovated in 2002 leading to the creation of two new Bars and 'The Cube' multi-functional space. The West Building dates back to the 1940s in a red brick style, complementing the Hartley Library opposite.  This originally held all of the Union's activities until the construction of the current Union. At present the building hosts the pub 'The Stags Head'. The newest building was built during the mid-1990s which includes the union shop and other retail stores.

The union operates four media outlets. Surge Radio, broadcasts from new studios in the main union building over the internet. Internet television station SUSUtv broadcasts a wide range of programmes live and on demand through their website. The student newspaper Wessex Scene is published once every three weeks. The Edge entertainment magazine began life as an insert of the Wessex Scene in 1995 before growing to become a full publication and online presence in 2011.

Halls of residence

The university provides accommodation for all first year students who require it and places in residences are available for international and MSc students. Accommodation may be catered, self-catered, have en-suite facilities, a sink in the room, or access to communal bathroom facilities. Each hall has a Junior Common Room (JCR) committee that is responsible for the running of social events and representing the residents to the students union and the university via the Students union JCR officer.

The university's accommodation exists around two large complexes of halls and some other small halls located around the city. These are:
Glen Eyre Complex – The complex lies less than half a mile to the north of Highfield Campus and houses approximately 2000 students. The complex consists of several building sets, designed over the years and arranged either around the central landscaped garden – the oldest buildings, Richard Newitt Courts are separated into blocks A-G and are closest to the Glen Bar, students in these blocks have very small flats (between 4 and 6 to a kitchen with usually more than one bathroom). Old Terrace and New Terrace are close to the site's entrance, New Terrace has ensuite rooms. Chancellors' courts, consisting of Selbourne, Jellicoe and Roll courts are the most modern blocks in the accommodation with Brunei house, the most basic of accommodations, on the outskirts. Located on the south side of Glen Eyre Road on the periphery of the site are Chamberlain Halls, which share most things with the main Glen Eyre site. This site consists of Hartley Grove, South Hill, Beechmount House and the Chamberlain blocks. All Glen Eyre Halls are self-catered at present.
Wessex Lane Halls – Located in Swaythling approximately one mile east of the Highfield Campus.  The complex provides accommodation for over 1,800 students and currently comprises two halls of residence: Montefiore Hall, and Connaught. Connaught Halls are fully catered. The complex also features South Stoneham House, a period building constructed in 1708.
City Gateway Hall  – Located in Swaythling one mile north east of the Highfield Campus at the intersection of two major roads. Opened in September 2015, the landmark building was included in the runners-up list of the 2015 Carbuncle Cup. Featuring a 15-story elliptical tower and two adjoining six-story rectangular accommodation blocks the hall provides accommodation for up to 375 students.
Mayflower Halls – Located in the city centre within the city's 'Cultural Quarter', and two-minutes walk away from Southampton Central railway station. The hall opened at the start of the 2014/2015 academic year, and houses over 1100 students in a mix of rooms. It includes a gym which is available to both residents and the public.
Archers Road – Lying two miles south of Highfield and housing 500 students, Archers Road compromises two halls on separate sites. The two halls, Gateley and Romero, are all self-contained and self catered but share a reception and other community facilities.
Highfield Halls – Located adjacent to Avenue Campus and half a mile from Highfield campus. Highfield halls comprises Aubrey and Wolfe houses and both have on site catering. The site is also used as a University conference facility during the summer months when vacated.
Gower Building – Gower is mainly used by mature and postgraduate students, located on Highfield campus. Gower contains a small number of self-contained apartments, located above other University amenities.
Erasmus Park – Located in Winchester, this hall houses around 400 students studying at the Winchester School of Art.
Riverside Way - Located in Winchester in close proximity to Erasmus Park. This is a private halls site but the university does have an agreement to allocate some students there.

Healthcare
The University Health Service is an NHS GP practice located on the main Highfield campus, with over 20,000 patients as of December 2021 working from Building 48 between the Physics & Maths Buildings.

Sports

The university's Sport and Wellbeing department runs the majority of the sports facilities on campus which are based predominately at two locations: the Jubilee Sports Centre and Wide Lane Sports Ground. The Jubilee Sports Centre, opened in 2004 at a cost of £8.5 million, is located on the Highfield Campus and contains a six-lane 25-metre swimming pool, 160 workstation gym and an eight-court sports hall. Wide Lane meanwhile is located nearby in Eastleigh and was refurbished at cost of £4.3 million in 2007. The  complex includes flood-lit synthetic turf and grass pitches, tennis courts, a pavilion and a 'Team Southampton' Gym. The university also runs facilities at the Avenue Campus, National Oceanography Centre, the Watersports Centre on the River Itchen and at Glen Eyre and Wessex Lane halls while there is another sports hall, squash courts, martial arts studio and bouldering wall located within the Students' Union.

The university competes in numerous sports in the BUCS South East Conference (after switching from the Western Conference in 2009). A number of elite athletes are supported by the SportsRec through sports bursaries and the UK Government's Talented Athlete Scholarship Scheme (TASS).

The University Athletic Union was formally established on 29 November 1929, by the University College council. Versions of the union had existed previously to which many clubs such as Cricket, Association Football, Rugby, Boxing, Gymnastics, Tennis and Boat clubs (all formed before the turn of the 20th century) were members.

Mustangs Baseball Club  
The Southampton Mustangs Baseball Club was founded in 1997.  In the early years, the club participated in mainly friendly games against other British university baseball teams, as no formal university league was in existence.  Starting in 1998, the Mustangs started to host a university baseball tournament – inviting other teams including Oxford, Cambridge, Portsmouth, Royal Holloway, and Norwich.  In 2004 the Mustangs entered into the national adult baseball leagues run by the British Baseball Federation (BBF).  The club entered in the lowest division, but after a few years of consolidation, the Mustangs have worked their way up from the lower leagues in the BBF to play in the top-tier league of the British baseball, the British National Baseball League (NBL), in the 2010 season.

National student championships 
Throughout its history the university has had a number of successful teams in National student championships.

Notable people

Alumni

Academics
Academics working at the university include:

 Sir Tim Berners-Lee, inventor of the World Wide Web
 Wendy Hall, inventor of Microcosm, a predecessor of the World Wide Web, founding director of the Web Science Trust between the University of Southampton and MIT;
 José Antonio Bowen, President of Goucher College and a Fellow of the Royal Society of Arts
 Erich Zepler, who made leading contributions to radio receiver development
 David Payne, inventor of EDFA for use in fibre optics cables
 Sir Barry Cunliffe, a pioneer of modern British archaeology
 Ray Monk, the biographer of Ludwig Wittgenstein
 Albie Sachs, former Judge of the Constitutional Court of South Africa;
 Tim Holt, former President of the Royal Statistical Society and Office for National Statistics.

See also

 Armorial of UK universities
 List of universities in the UK

References

Further reading
 Patterson, A. Temple (1962). The University of Southampton : A Centenary History of the Evolution and Development of the University of Southampton, 1862–1962. Southampton: The Camelot Press Ltd.
 Nash, Sally and Martin Sherwood (2002). University of Southampton: An Illustrated History. London: James and James

External links 

 
 University of Southampton Students' Union website

 
Russell Group
Educational institutions established in 1952
1952 establishments in England
Tourist attractions in Southampton
Universities established in the 1950s
Universities UK